Lokmanya Tilak Terminus–Azamgarh Weekly Express is an Express train of the Indian Railways connecting  in Maharashtra and  of Uttar Pradesh. It is currently being operated with 11053/11054 train numbers on a weekly basis.

Service

 11053/Mumbai LTT–Azamgarh Weekly Express has an average speed of 46 km/hr and covers 1546 km in 33 hrs 35 mins
 11054/Azamgarh–Mumbai LTT Weekly Express has an average speed of 50 km/hr and covers 1546 km in 33 hrs 50 mins.

Route and halts 

The important halts of the train are:

Coach composition

The train consists of 22 coaches (LHB RAKES):

 1 AC II Tier
 4 AC III Tier
 10 Sleeper coaches
 5 General
 2 EOG

Traction

Both trains are hauled by an Itarsi-based WAP-4 electric locomotive from Lokmanya Tilak Terminus to  handing over to another Itarsi-based WDM-3A diesel locomotive up to Azamgarh.

Direction reversal

The train reverses its direction 1 times:

Rake sharing

This train shares its rake with 12143/12144 Lokmanya Tilak Terminus–Sultanpur Express.

Timing  

11053 – Starts Lokmanya Tilak Terminus every Wednesday at 4:40 PM IST and reaches Azamgarh on Friday 2:10 PM IST
11054 – Starts Azamgarh at 5:20 AM IST on Friday and reaches Lokmanya Tilak Terminus 12:15 PM IST on 2nd day

Gallery

Notes

References

External links 
 11053/Mumbai LTT–Azamgarh Weekly Express India Rail Info
 11054/Azamgarh–Mumbai LTT Weekly Express India Rail Info

Express trains in India
Rail transport in Maharashtra
Rail transport in Madhya Pradesh
Rail transport in Uttar Pradesh
Transport in Mumbai
Railway services introduced in 2014
Transport in Azamgarh